Cnemaspis latha is a species of diurnal gecko endemic to island of Sri Lanka.

References

 http://reptile-database.reptarium.cz/species?genus=Cnemaspis&species=latha
 http://www.srisalike.com/Founa/Reptiles/Endemic/Cnemaspis%20latha.aspx
 http://slendemics.net/easl/reps/Geckos.html

Reptiles of Sri Lanka
Reptiles described in 2007
latha